The 1920 Ottawa Rough Riders finished in 3rd place in the Interprovincial Rugby Football Union with a 3–3 record, but failed to qualify for the playoffs.

Regular season

Standings

Schedule

References

Ottawa Rough Riders seasons